Talatamaty is a town in Analamanga Region, in the  Central Highlands of Madagascar, located at 5 km from the capital of Antananarivo.

The RN 52 runs thru this town.

References

Populated places in Analamanga